Penrhyn is a Cook Islands electoral division returning one member to the Cook Islands Parliament.  Its current representative is Wilkie Rasmussen, who has held the seat since 2002.

The electorate consists of the atoll of Penrhyn.

Members of Parliament for Penrhyn
Unless otherwise stated, all MPs terms began and ended at general elections.

Election results

2006 election

2004 election

2002 byelection

References

Cook Islands electorates